Osage Township is an inactive township in Laclede County, in the U.S. state of Missouri.

Osage Township was erected in 1849, taking its name from the Osage River.

References

Townships in Missouri
Townships in Laclede County, Missouri